William, Bill r Willy Larsen may refer to:

William Washington Larsen (1871–1938), American legislator from Georgia
Willy Larsen (1885–1935), Finnish-American accordionist and recording artist
William Larsen (1927–1996), American actor in Heaven Can Wait (1978 film) 
Bill Larsen (1928–1993), American magician married to "Princess Irene" Larsen
William Wiik Larsen (born 1986), Norwegian record producer and songwriter

See also
William Larson (disambiguation)